The 1996 Rio 400 was a CART race at the Emerson Fittipaldi Speedway. It happened on March 17, 1996. It was the 2nd round of the 1996 IndyCar season.

Starting grid

 Alex Zanardi
 Jimmy Vasser
 André Ribeiro
 Greg Moore
 Parker Johnstone
 Bobby Rahal
 Gil de Ferran
 Adrian Fernandez
 Maurício Gugelmin
 Scott Pruett
 Robby Gordon
 Al Unser Jr.
 Emerson Fittipaldi
 Roberto Moreno
 Michael Andretti
 Bryan Herta
 Carlos Guerrero
 Mark Blundell
 Eddie Lawson
 Hiro Matsushita
 Stefan Johansson
 Jeff Krosnoff
 Marco Greco
 Juan Manuel Fangio II
 Paul Tracy
 Raul Boesel
 Christian Fittipaldi

Did not start
 Scott Goodyear Wrecked during practice; sidelined for most of the season

Race

On lap 11, Mark Blundell had a serious crash in turn 4, suffering a broken foot. The race continued under yellow caution flags until lap 23, with Alex Zanardi leading from Greg Moore and André Ribeiro. De Ferran ran out of fuel on lap 80. Moore had taken the lead, but retired with suspension problems on lap 115. Ribeiro eventually won from Al Unser Jr. and Scott Pruett.

Final results
Top 12
 André Ribeiro 133 laps
 Al Unser Jr. +2.14 seconds
 Scott Pruett
 Alex Zanardi
 Christian Fittipaldi
 Bobby Rahal
 Raul Boesel
 Jimmy Vasser +1
 Roberto Moreno +1
 Gil de Ferran +2
 Emerson Fittipaldi +2
 Marco Greco +2

Drivers who did not complete the race
 Robby Gordon +9 Contact
 Parker Johnstone +15 Fuel
 Greg Moore +17 Contact
 Paul Tracy +31 Contact w/ Greco
 Carlos Guerrero +38 Engine
 Eddie Lawson +46 Broken drive line
 Michael Andretti +47 Engine
 Stefan Johansson +72 Cooling
 Hiro Matsushita +80 Header
 Maurício Gugelmin +84 Suspension
 Jeff Krosnoff +96 Engine
 Mark Blundell +123 Contact

Point standings
After 2 of 16 races
 Scott Pruett 26 points
 Jimmy Vasser 25 points
 Al Unser Jr. 21 points
 André Ribeiro 20 points
 Gil de Ferran 19 points
 Bobby Rahal 18 points

Rio 200
IndyCar Rio 400
Rio 400